Michelle "Shelly" Zimbalist Rosaldo (1944 in New York City – 1981 in Philippines) was a social, linguistic, and psychological anthropologist famous for her studies of the Ilongot people in the Philippines and for her pioneering role in women's studies and the anthropology of gender.

Life
Born in New York in 1944, Michelle Zimbalist attended Radcliffe College (Harvard College's sister school, formally merged with Harvard in 1999), where she concentrated in English literature. She spent a summer among the Maya in southern Mexico as part of a field trip arranged by Evon Z. Vogt. After receiving her AB, she began graduate study at Harvard in social anthropology.

Michelle Rosaldo and her husband, anthropologist Renato Rosaldo, both carried out their dissertation fieldwork with the Ilongot people in northern Luzon, the Philippines, during 1967-1969. Rosaldo's research focused on Ilongot concepts of emotion (an exercise in ethnopsychology, the study of local or folk concepts of mind), while her husband collected material on the history of Ilongot headhunting practices, which were dying out at the time of their research. Rosaldo received her PhD in social anthropology from Harvard in 1972. After completing their PhDs, Michelle and Renato Rosaldo were both hired at Stanford University. The couple returned again to the Ilongot in 1974 for further research, published as Knowledge and Passion (1980).

Michelle Rosaldo wrote or edited several important works in the anthropology of women and gender relations and co-founded the Program in Feminist Studies at Stanford University. In 1979 she received Stanford's Dinkelspiel Award for outstanding service to undergraduate education.

Michelle Rosaldo died from an accidental fall while conducting fieldwork in the Philippines in 1981. She was survived by her husband and their two sons.

The Michelle Z. Rosaldo Summer Field Research Grant was later established in her memory at the Department of Anthropology at Stanford University to provide funding for undergraduate students to conduct fieldwork.

Selected publications
Rosaldo, Michelle Z. (1971) Context and metaphor in Ilongot oral tradition. PhD thesis. Cambridge, MA: Harvard University Archives.
Rosaldo, Michelle Zimbalist. (1980) Knowledge and Passion: Ilongot Notions of Self and Social Life. Cambridge, UK: Cambridge University Press.
Rosaldo, Michelle Z. (1984)   “Toward an anthropology of self and feeling.” In Culture Theory: essays on mind, self, and emotion. R. A. Shweder and R. A. LeVine, editors. pp. 137–157. Cambridge, UK: Cambridge University Press.
Keohane, Nannerl O., Michelle Z. Rosaldo, and Barbara C. Gelpi, editors. (1982) Feminist theory: a critique of ideology. Chicago: University of Chicago Press.
Lamphere, Louise and Michelle Zimbalist Rosaldo, editors. (1974) Women, Culture, and Society. Stanford University Press. Stanford, California.
Lugo, Alejandro and Bill Maurer, editors. (2000)  Gender Matters: Rereading Michelle Z. Rosaldo. Ann Arbor: University of Michigan Press.

References

External links
 Memorial Resolution: Michelle Zimbalist Rosaldo

Stanford University Department of Anthropology faculty
Psychological anthropologists
American women anthropologists
Radcliffe College alumni
1944 births
1981 deaths
Accidental deaths from falls
Accidental deaths in the Philippines
20th-century American women scientists
20th-century American scientists
20th-century American anthropologists